Giuliano Giardini (born 1 January 1960) is a retired Italian alpine skier who competed in the 1980 Winter Olympics.

References

External links
 

1960 births
Living people
Italian male alpine skiers
Olympic alpine skiers of Italy
Alpine skiers at the 1980 Winter Olympics